Thomas R. "Randy" Ligon is an American politician. He is a member of the South Carolina House of Representatives from the 43rd District, serving since 2018. He is a member of the Republican party.

In 2023, Ligon was briefly among the Republican co-sponsors of the South Carolina Prenatal Equal Protection Act of 2023, which would make women who had abortions eligible for the death penalty; he later withdrew his sponsorship.

References

Living people
Republican Party members of the South Carolina House of Representatives
21st-century American politicians
Clemson University alumni
Year of birth missing (living people)